Michael Wiringi (born 1 August 1985 in Hāwera) is a New Zealand-born Romanian rugby union player. He plays as a fly-half.

He now plays for Baia Mare and Romania. Wiringi made his debut for the Romania in 2015 and was part of the squad at the 2015 Rugby World Cup.

References

External links

 
 
 

Living people
1985 births
Rugby union players from Hāwera
Romanian rugby union players
Romania international rugby union players
Rugby union fly-halves